Chris Evans Drivetime was the incarnation of the drivetime show on BBC Radio 2 from 18 April 2006 to 24 December 2009, and aired on weekdays between 17:00 and 19:00 in the United Kingdom. It was presented by Chris Evans, who moved to Drivetime from his Saturday afternoon show after Johnnie Walker left the slot after seven years in 2006. On 7 September 2009 the BBC announced that Evans would take over the breakfast show from Sir Terry Wogan, from January 2010, and on 15 September it was confirmed that Simon Mayo would replace Evans on Drivetime. Mayo had been a stand in presenter for Evans on a few occasions.

Ethos 
Chris thanked Steve Wright or his stand in for their show, and then declared "now it's our go, and that includes you".  Throughout the show, Chris played a mixture of music both old and new, spoke to people that were making the more bizarre headlines, and read listeners' texts and emails.

Unlike most live radio programmes, each show was given a title, usually of a quirky nature, and was dedicated to a person or group. Usually this group was all people who had done something that particular day, such as "resisted a craving".

The team 
Chris was joined throughout the programme by three colleagues. Rebecca Pike, née Fox, brought listeners the business news. Jonny Saunders read the sports headlines. Sally Boazman presented the travel updates.

Rebecca Pike 
Rebecca Pike, formerly Fox, and known commonly as Foxy, read the business headlines including the FTSE market data and exchange rates, at 17:20 and 18:20 each day. Listeners also sent in their business-related questions, which Foxy then answered in the second slot. This feature was known as Fox the Fox and was accompanied by Danny Kaye's Outfox the Fox, which acted as the theme tune.  Fox the Fox did not appear on Fridays, when the 18:20 round-up was marked with an innovation slot.

Jonny Saunders 
Jonny Saunders rounded up the sports headlines at several points during the show, and spoke to a sports personality every day at 18:50, who was said to be "in the locker".  Chris tended to introduce the locker slot by asking Jonny: "Who's in the locker-cocker?"  Jonny's Friday slot included a talk about a "mad sport". Jonny also provided the voice for top tenuous, jukebox jury and gobsmackers.  See below.

Sally Boazman 
As well as her traffic duties, Sally was involved with various other aspects of the show's line-up.  See below.

Features, Monday – Thursday 
As well as business, sport and traffic; the line-up on most weekdays included various features.

The Kids 
Chris spoke to a child each day, who had done something for the first time ever.  Their achievements were awarded with a fanfare.

Woman's Minute 
In a gentle parody of BBC Radio 4's Woman's Hour, Chris spoke to four women in quick succession.  They were asked who they were, where they were and what they were driving, and for their answer to that week's question.  In early 2009, Chris asked the question: "What do you do that's a bit nutty but effective?" and it was deemed so effective that it remained active until April.

Theme Time Radio Minute 
A parody of Bob Dylan's Theme Time Radio Hour, Chris played a listener-requested TV theme tune.

Top Tenuous 
Jonny decided the famous person whose listener associations were showcased.  This was usually somebody who had been in the news on that day.  The aim was for these associations to be as weak as possible, with the top 10 most tenuous being the ones selected.

Drivetime Jukebox Jury 
Jonny also presided over the Jukebox Jury.  A new track was played, and listeners were invited to text either "hit" or "miss", plus their comments, to the programme.  Jonny read The Good, The Bad and The Ugly of these comments (over said theme tune) before Chris announced whether the track was overall a hit or a miss. Sir Tom Jones (singer) was present at the judgement of his single "Give a Little Love", but Chris claimed that there were no negative texts received.

Gobsmackers 
Immediately following the drivetime jukebox jury, two connected tracks were played, which were selected by a listener.

Monday Mince 
In 2009, a cheesy song was played after the 18:00 news each Monday, dedicated to burly truckers everywhere.

Thirsty Thursday 
Thursday's programme was known as Thirsty Thursday, and included food with Nigel Barden.  The daily clips of how to contact the show were also played simultaneously, as something of a special treat.

All Request Friday 
On Fridays, each song was selected by a listener, and all features apart from sport, business and travel were hour-short.  The first track was selected on the blog, and thereafter listeners phoned in their requests.  All-request Friday was introduced by a hearty rendition of the song "Bring Chris Evans On".  When the Friday show was cancelled, such as in Holy Week, Thursday was used as the request day.

The H Spot and The C Spot 
Selected annually, the only songs not requested by listeners were played at 17:20 and 18:20. In 2009, the 17:20 tune was the theme to Happy Days, known as the H Spot. The 18:20 spot, which marked the beginning of the weekend, was Sammy Davis, Jr.'s "The Candy Man", having previously been occupied by the E Spot; Elvis Presley's "The Wonder of You"; and, in 2008, the "D Spot"; Tom Jones' "Delilah", marked the beginning of the weekend. The E Spot was chosen because a listener on the blog chose "The Wonder of You" as the first song of the show, on the week Lesley Douglas resigned.  Chris announced that if he ever decided to end the D Spot he would replace it with the E Spot.  Chris and Sally sang along, and listeners were encouraged to inform the show of where they sang along.

Mascot 
Also selected annually was the drivetime mascot.  The Rex Factor saw listeners' dogs battle it out to become the official mascot.  The mascot until the end of the show's run was Biscuit, a bearded collie/terrier X.  As of  9 April 2009, Biscuit had 1,619 friends on his Facebook page.

Awards
At the 2009 Sony Radio Academy Awards, Chris Evans was awarded Radio Personality of the Year, and Drivetime was awarded the Entertainment Award.  Additionally, Sally Boazman received awards for her traffic reporting on numerous occasions.

U2 Concert 
On 27 February 2009, U2 joined the show and played a 20-minute concert on the roof of Broadcasting House to 5,000 listeners.

References 

British music radio programmes
BBC Radio 2 programmes